Houlletia odoratissima is a species of orchid that occurs in the Andes from Panama to Bolivia.

References

External links 

odoratissima
Orchids of Bolivia
Orchids of Panama